Bidan-e Khvajeh (also Romanized as Bīdān-e Khvājeh; also known as Bidan, Bīdan-e Khvājeh Ra’īs, and Bidan Khvajeh Ra’is) is a village in Khorramdasht Rural District, in the Central District of Kuhbanan County, Kerman Province, Iran. At the 2006 census, its population was 77, in 22 families.

References 

Populated places in Kuhbanan County